Luhe-Ma'an Air Base, also known as Nanjing Luhe Airport or Nanjing Air Base, is a military airport that has been home to the Nanjing Air Base of the People's Liberation Army Air Force since 2015, replacing the old Dajiaochang Airport.  It is located in suburban Luhe District across the Yangtze River from the center of Nanjing, capital of China's Jiangsu Province.

History
With the rapid expansion of the city of Nanjing, the military Dajiaochang Airport, originally far from the city, is increasingly surrounded by the urban area and restricting its development.  Since 2003 the local government and the military have been in talks on relocating the air base.  In January 2006 a site for the new airport was determined and the project received approvals from the State Council and the Central Military Commission in January 2009.  On 8 August 2012, construction for Luhe Airport was started in suburban Luhe District.  Luhe Airport was opened in July 2015, and Dajiaochang Airport was closed on 30 July 2015.

Operations 
Luhe Air Base hosts the 29th and 30th Bomber Regiments of the 10th Bomber Division, the only bomber unit in Eastern Theater Command and their assigned H-6K bombers.

See also

Nanjing Lukou International Airport
List of airports in China
List of People's Liberation Army Air Force airbases

References

Airports in Jiangsu
Chinese Air Force bases
Airports established in 2015
Buildings and structures in Nanjing
2015 establishments in China